The Council of Government of the Region of Murcia (Spanish: Consejo de Gobierno de la Región de Murcia) is the collegiate body charged with the executive and administrative functions of the autonomous community of the Region of Murcia, Spain.

It is headed by the president of the Region of Murcia, and additionally includes the appointed vice presidents and consejeros (cabinet ministers).

The cabinet ceases in office after the holding of legislative elections, remaining in a caretaking role until a new cabinet assumes office.

Its main headquarters are located at the Palace of Saint Esteban (Palacio de San Esteban), in Murcia.

Cabinets 
 Hernández Ros (1983–1984)
 Collado I (1984–1987)
 Collado II (1987–1991)
 Collado III (1991–1993)
 Leguina III (1993–1995)
 Valcárcel I (1995–1999)
 Valcárcel II (1999–2003)
 Valcárcel III (2003–2007)
 Valcárcel IV (2007–2011)
 Valcárcel V (2011–2014) 
 Garre (2014–2015)
 Sánchez (2015–2017)
 López Miras I (2017–2019)
 López Miras II (2019–present)

Current composition

References